Only Sparrows is the third studio album by Australian musician, Josh Pyke. It was released on the 19 of August 2011 by Ivy League Records and peaked at number 4 on the ARIA Charts.

At the ARIA Music Awards of 2012, the album was nominated for ARIA Award for Best Adult Contemporary Album.

Reception

Jon O'Brien from AllMusic said "Inspired by a soul-searching trip to New York, Sydney singer/songwriter Josh Pyke abandons his usual one-man band style of recording and for the first time, relinquishes some control to additional musicians... it's an approach which has resulted in a more expansive sound". O'Brien said "Opener 'Clovis Son' is a gorgeous fusion of gently strummed acoustics, twinkling glockenspiels, and dreamy West Coast harmonies which shows that his ability to tug at the heartstrings hasn't deserted him during his three-year solo absence, a quality also perfectly showcased on 'Punch in the Heart', a somber, stripped-back ballad featuring the ethereal vocals of Little Birdy's Katy Steele, while the melancholic 'Particles' begins with a brooding alt-rock hook before merging with an array of clattering rhythms and skittering synths on a surprisingly convincing attempt at folktronica."

Track listing

Charts

Release history

References

2011 albums
Josh Pyke albums
Ivy League Records albums